Knott's Scary Farm or Knott's Halloween Haunt is a seasonal Halloween event at Knott's Berry Farm in Buena Park, California. It is an event in which the theme park is transformed into "160 acres of horror", via a series of roaming monsters, terrifying mazes and 'scare zones'. As of 2010, it was said to be the first, largest and longest-running Halloween event to be held at a theme park.

Haunted attractions
Wax Works
Origins: The Curse Of Calico
Dark Entities
The Depths
Mesmer: Sideshow Of The Mind
Bloodline 1842
The Grimoire

Attraction history

History

Originally a three-night affair, running October 26-28, 1973, the annual six-week-long event will celebrate their frightning 50th year in 2023. It has become the largest event of any theme park. The concept was introduced to the park's operations committee in a meeting in September 1973 by George Condos and Martha Boyd of the marketing department, and Bill Hollingshead and Gary Salisbury of the entertainment office. Bud Hurlbut, who built and operated (as a concessionaire) the Mine Ride, Log Ride and other rides, decided that having static props wasn't enough, so he put on a gorilla suit and scared guests as they rode on the Mine Ride.  Halloween Haunt was an instant hit, and by the next year, the event sold out nightly.  Knott's Berry Farm was originally modeled after Calico, California, a ghost town that was a result of the California silver rush. Already having a dedicated Ghost Town section in the theme park, this area would become the designed area for the original Halloween Haunt, eventually expanding to the entire park. 

The 1980s would continue to be a success for the theme park, and popular culture icons were employed to represent the event. In 1981, actor and parodist "Weird Al" Yankovic joined the cast, as did Cassandra "Elvira" Peterson in the following year. Elvira was prominently featured in many Halloween Haunt events until 2001. According to postings on her Myspace page, Cassandra was released from her contract by the park's new owners due to their wanting a more family friendly appeal. The 1990s would show a different approach to Halloween. Humor was added to many facets in the theme park and Knott's turned from the explicit horror to black comedy. This continuing balance of horror and humor has been a key to the continuing success of Knott's Halloween Haunt. 

On August 4th, 2020, Knott's announced that the 48th Scary Farm season would be cancelled in response to the ongoing COVID-19 pandemic which caused the closure of theme parks in California in March at the request of California Governor Gavin Newsom and was deferred to 2021. The theme park was not open at the time of the announcement.

Park transformation
While Knott's Berry Farm is a year-round theme park, the entire acreage is modified to fit the Halloween motif. Rides and other attractions are converted into macabre themes. Seasonal workers are cast as a variety of monsters, roaming the  park in terrifying scare zones, amidst haze produced by giant fog machines. Some characters have developed a special appeal, such as the legendary, iconic, and infamous villainess herself Sarah Rebecca Anne "The Green Witch Of Calico" Morgan-Marshall. Back in 1973 Diana Kelly-Kirchen was chosen to don the role of the first Green Witch under the name of Spooky Sarah when Haunt began. After Diana left the Haunt she passed her role to Charlene Parker in 1982. Then in September of 2021 Sarah was replaced by The Conductor as the new face of Knott's Scary Farm. The controversial "Hanging" live show was a staple of the Haunt that lampoons celebrities and persons in the news through a series of staged hangings. The Hanging had been an annual event since the 1979 Halloween Haunt but celebrated its final year in 2019.
As of 2022, the park has 9 mazes, 5 scare zones, 4 experiences, and 3 live shows.

Commercials, media and awards
Knott's Scary Farm has won Amusement Today's Golden Ticket Award for Best Halloween Event twice, in 2005 and 2007.

See also
Halloween Haunt, Halloween events at other Cedar Fair parks
Six Flags Fright Fest, Halloween events at Six Flags parks
Universal's Halloween Horror Nights, Halloween event at Universal parks
Howl-O-Scream, Halloween event at Busch Gardens

References

 Knott's Scary Farm 2011: Here's A Cheer For 38 Years Of Fears, Leo Buck Buck-ing Trends November 30, 2011

External links 

 Comprehensive tribute site
 Halloween Haunt reviews, photos, and video

Knott's Berry Farm
Halloween events in the United States
Haunted attractions (simulated)
Recurring events established in 1973
1973 establishments in California